Agim Hajrizi (20 February 1961 – 24 March 1999) was a Kosovo Albanian human rights activist and the president of the Union of Independent Trade Unions of Kosova (BSPK). Agim Hajrizi was murdered by Serb paramilitary soldiers in his home in Mitrovica on 24 March 1999, during the Kosovo War, with his mother Nazmie and 12-year-old son Ilir. It is thought he was targeted for his political activities, similar to other prominent Kosovo Albanians killed by Serbian forces at the same time.

See also
 List of unsolved murders
 Fehmi Agani
 Ukshin Hoti

References

1961 births
1990s murders in Kosovo
1999 crimes in Kosovo
1999 deaths
1999 murders in Europe
Assassinated activists
Assassinated Kosovan people
Kosovan activists
Kosovo Albanians
Male murder victims
People from Mitrovica, Kosovo
People murdered in Kosovo
People murdered in Serbia
Unsolved murders in Serbia
People killed in the Kosovo War